Gerald Henry Seeley (9 May 1903 – 23 July 1941) was an English cricketer who played a single first-class game, for Worcestershire against Nottinghamshire at Worcester in 1921. Batting at number seven in his only innings, he scored 7 before falling lbw to John Gunn.
Although this was his only appearance at such a high level, he did play several times for Marlborough College and in 1921, a fortnight before his Worcestershire appearance, he hit 122 and took 5-59 against Rugby School.

Seeley was born at Port Blair. in the Andaman Islands.

Military service and death
In the Second World War he became an air gunner in the Royal Air Force, and became a pilot officer. On 23 July 1941, Seeley took off from RAF Manston as the rear air gunner of a Bristol Blenheim bomber. Whilst conducting anti-shipping operations over the English Channel, the Blenheim was shot down off Ostend by a Kriegsmarine flak ship, killing 2 of the 3 on board, Seeley and pilot Phillip Bernard Ashby. Pilot Officer Martin Lowes became a prisoner of war. He is buried in the Oostende New Communal Cemetery.

Notes

References
Gerald Seeley from CricketArchive

English cricketers
Worcestershire cricketers
Royal Air Force personnel killed in World War II
1903 births
1941 deaths
People from Port Blair
Sportspeople from the Andaman and Nicobar Islands
Royal Air Force officers